Sendamangalam also known as Senthamangalam Taluka is a town panchayat in the Indian state of Tamil Nadu is situated in Namakkal District.

History

The history of Sendamangalam, Namakkal is often misunderstood with Sendamangalam, Kallkurichi dt (formerly Villupuram dt)

Geography
It has an average elevation of 240 metres (715 feet). It is close to Kolli Hills (கொல்லி மலை) - which is part of the Eastern Ghats. The closest river is Kaveri. The city is approximately 350 km southwest of Chennai, 255 km south of Bangalore, 50 km south of Salem and 93 km northwest of Tiruchirapalli (Trichy) and around 200 km North of Madurai.

Climate  
The temperature ranges from 20 to 44 °C throughout the year.

Demographics

Population 
 India census, Sendamangalam had a population of 18,085. Males constitute 50% of the population and females 50%. Sendamangalam has an average literacy rate of 64%, higher than the national average of 59.5%: male literacy is 73%, and female literacy is 56%. In Sendamangalam, 9% of the population is under 6 years of age.

Government and politics  
Senthamangalam (state assembly constituency)(ST) Sendamangalam taluk is part of Namakkal (Lok Sabha constituency).

Civic Administration 
Sendamangalam taluk in Namakkal (Lok Sabha constituency) started functioning as Taluk from 2 June 2015. The taluk office started functioning at a private building on Sendamangalam – Budhansandai Road near Primary Agriculture Cooperative Credit Society.

Currently, two Tahsildars, five Deputy Tahsildars and 26 officials were appointed for the new Taluk.

Economy

Transport

By Air  
The nearest airport is in Salem(55 km).

By Rail  
The nearest major railway station is at Namakkal (10 km) and Salem (55 km).

By Road  
Sendamangalam  is located 12 km northeast from Namakkal on State Highway SH-95 (connecting Mohanur-Namakkal-Muthugapatti-Akkiampatty-Sendamangalam-Gandhipuram-Kalappanaickenpatty, Rasipuram, 54 km long). The nearest cities from Sendamangalam are Namakkal (12 km), Karur (45 km), Salem (50 km), Erode (62 km), and Tiruchirapalli (93 km). Chennai, the capital of the state, is 380 km from Namakkal.

Education 

VIVEKA MATRICULATION SCHOOL

References

External links

Sendamangalam Town Panchayat: Tamil Nadu Government Directorate of Panchayats
Sendamangalam Block Panchayat Villages
Namakkal District Webpage (Official Website of  Namakkal District Government)
Namakkal District Water Supply Status (Tamil Nadu Water Supply and Drainage Board)

Cities and towns in Namakkal district